Neville Dilkes (born 28 August 1930) is an English conductor and organist.

He was born in Derby, England to a musical family.  He became a Fellow of Trinity College of Music, London, and later did his National Service in the Royal Army Medical Corps.  He taught at Repton, and then in 1955 was named Director of Music at Corby Grammar School, where he mounted a school production of Gluck's opera Orfeo ed Euridice.  This brought together a number of musicians from the Midlands, who formed the Kettering Symphony Orchestra under Dilkes' leadership.

In 1961 he formed the Midland Sinfonia and also a chamber music performance group, Opera Da Camera.  The Midland Sinfonia was administered from Dilkes' home for its first five years; it acquired a permanent office in Nottingham in 1966, and gave its first London concert in 1968.  It was later renamed the English Sinfonia.

In 1963 he joined the Netherlands Radio Union International Conductors' Course, where his principal tutor was Dean Dixon.  He was the inaugural winner of the Watney-Sargent Award, chosen by Sir Malcolm Sargent himself.

He is an associate conductor of the Philomusica of London.  He is a Fellow of the Royal College of Organists.

Recordings
Neville Dilkes’ recordings include:
 Malcolm Arnold, Sinfonietta No. 1, Op. 48; Sinfonietta No. 2, Op. 65 (Philharmonia Orchestra, 1977)
 George Butterworth, The Banks of Green Willow, A Shropshire Lad
 Franz Doppler, Wood-bird for flute and 4 horns, Op. 21 (Philharmonia Orchestra)
 Hamilton Harty, A John Field Suite (English Sinfonia)
 Arthur Honegger, Concerto da camera for flute, English horn and strings
 John Ireland, The Holy Boy (English Sinfonia)
 Constant Lambert, Concerto for Piano and Nine Players, Richard Rodney Bennett, members of the English Sinfonia,  Polydor 2383 391, 1976
 Walter Leigh, Concertino for Harpsichord and Strings (conductor and harpischordist; English Sinfonia)
 E. J. Moeran, Symphony in G minor, Two Pieces for Small Orchestra (English Sinfonia)
 Peter Warlock, Capriol Suite

Private life
Neville Dilkes married Pamela Walton, who died in 1979, they had four daughters.  He married Christine Allen in 1986.

He lives in Nalliers, France.

References

1930 births
Living people
English conductors (music)
British male conductors (music)
English classical organists
British male organists
Fellows of the Royal College of Organists
People from Derby
21st-century British conductors (music)
21st-century organists
21st-century British male musicians
Male classical organists